The Young and Prodigious T.S. Spivet is a 2013 adventure-drama film directed by Jean-Pierre Jeunet and co-written with Guillaume Laurant, an adaptation of the 2009 book The Selected Works of T. S. Spivet written by Reif Larsen. The film stars Helena Bonham Carter, Judy Davis, Callum Keith Rennie, and Kyle Catlett.

Plot

T.S. Spivet is a 10-year-old boy and budding cartographer living on a secluded, rural Montana ranch with his moody older sister, his pretentious entomologist mother, and his emotionally distant and quiet wannabe cowboy father. Lonely and often ignored and belittled by the people around him – even his own teacher, who envies the boy's talent – T.S. spends most of his time playing, making amateur inventions, and meandering around the ranch with the family dog, Tapioca. T.S. reveals that he had a fraternal twin brother, Layton, who was much more into cowboy-themed things, like his father, but not as scientifically inclined as T.S. was. A tragedy unfolds as T.S. describes how he and his brother were out playing in an old barn on the property.

T.S. receives notice from the Smithsonian Institution, all the way across the country in Washington, that he has won the Baird Award for inventing a perpetual motion machine. Ms. Jibsen, the museum director, believes that T.S. is a grown man, and that the little boy on the telephone is the son of the prize-winner. Initially reluctant, T.S. decides that the best course of action is to run away from home to receive the prize. Before leaving, he packs a suitcase and takes one last look at Layton's old bedroom, a shrine of dusty toys and furniture that his parents are unable to bring themselves to throw away. T.S. passes his sister and his father upon leaving, who are both too wrapped up in their own daily routines to notice him.

That day, T.S. travels initially by train, hitching a ride in one of the rail cars, where he plays and imagines that Layton is still there with him, clear enough for a conversation. After nearly being caught by a guard at the train station, T.S. realizes that he needs to be careful, opting to sleep in an auction show camper that's being transported (there's a life-sized cardboard stencil of a family eating dinner that he can mimic so a guard looking in thinks he's just part of the art). He only leaves the camper at night, in search of food, where he meets a hobo going by the moniker "Two Clouds". Two Clouds tells the boy a whimsical story of a sparrow and a pine tree, suggesting that everybody reaches the right destination for themselves eventually. T.S. contemplates using a nearby payphone to call his family, but he can't bring himself to do it.

The next day, T.S. walks along the railroad tracks with his backpack (having stored his suitcase in a nearby electrical grid box), when a fat, mean-spirited policeman begins chasing him and shouting profanities at him. T.S. is forced to climb atop a separating bridge where a boat is passing through. Realizing that maybe he went too far, the policeman panics when T.S. nearly falls to his death, instructing him on how to climb back up to safety, but once T.S. is safe, he goes right back to chasing him again. T.S. eventually loses him, where he hitchhikes with a friendly trucker named Rick, a man who enjoys meeting people and chronicling this in photography. T.S. realizes, after inquiring about a photo of Rick in military garb pointing a machine gun at an Arab man's head, that Rick was a soldier post-9/11. Rick tries to downplay the experience with dark humour. Allowing T.S. to sleep on the truck, he notices that the boy is injured from nearly falling off the bridge earlier that day, and advises him to see a doctor.

After Rick drops him off in Washington, T.S. meets Ms. Jibsen at the Smithsonian. Skeptical that the boy could possibly be the one who invented the motion machine, T.S. proves her wrong by describing his scientific process. T.S. fibs and says he's an orphan, fearing that his parents will show up and be angry at him if they discover where he is. Ms. Jibsen, basking in T.S.'s spotlight, insists on being his new guardian and accompanying him to the conference where he'll be given the Baird Award. She often speaks over him though, much like most of the adults in his life do, which annoys him. He sits at a table alone during the conference, but is suddenly swarmed by a crowd of admirers when it's discovered that he's the boy who made the prizewinning invention.

T.S. gives a speech, where he eventually reveals that Layton shot himself in the barn, bringing his audience to tears. He admits, sobbing, that nobody ever even talks about Layton anymore, as if his brother never even existed. Unbeknownst to him, his mother watches from the rafters, having driven to Washington to find him. When T.S. appears on a sensationalist talk show later on, the host, Roy, is interrupted by T.S.'s mother, much to Ms. Jibsen's anger when she realizes that she can't be in charge of T.S. anymore. After a tense reunion, T.S. hugs his mother, but as they both leave, Roy and Ms. Jibsen chase after them. Ms. Jibsen, having gotten herself drunk, swears at T.S. and insults him. T.S.'s father appears and punches out Roy for harassing his son, while T.S.'s mother punches Ms. Jibsen. T.S. apologizes for hurting his father's feelings, but his father smiles at him and gives him a piggyback ride, letting the boy wear his favourite cowboy hat.

Back at home, it's revealed through T.S. in an epilogue that his mother just gave birth to a new baby. T.S. puts his skills to the test and invents an even better perpetual motion machine than the last one, and shows how it's used to rock his new infant sibling's cradle on the front porch.

Cast

Production
After writing and directing Micmacs, Jeunet preferred his next film to be based on an existing story. Before Larsen's book was published, he had shortlisted several of his favourite directors to make a film based on the book, and was contacted by Jeunet. Filming was done from June to October 2012, mainly in Quebec and Alberta, Canada, with some scenes in Washington, D.C. and Chicago. The Franco-Canadian production was Jeunet's first 3D film. Also, a track from the videogame Mass Effect 3 called "Leaving Earth" was used during TS's speech at the Institute.

Release
Rights for the 2015 U.S. release were sold to Harvey Weinstein. Weinstein had requested cuts to the film which the director refused to make. Jeunet claims that the release was hobbled by Weinstein, and as a result, the film did not do as well as it should have.

Reception

Box office
In France, the film was released on 16 October 2013. It collects 676,900 entries during its theatrical run.  The film was released in the United States on 31 July 2015. In total, the film accumulated just over $7.6 million in worldwide box office, including approximately $5.6 million in France and approximately $100,000 in the United States, for a budget of $26 million.

Critical response
The Young and Prodigious T.S. Spivet received generally positive reviews from critics. , the film holds a 76% approval rating on Rotten Tomatoes, based on 51 reviews with an average rating of 6.02/10. The site's critical consensus reads "The Young and Prodigious T.S. Spivet brings its bestselling source material beautifully to life, offering a blend of visual thrills and poignant pathos that help tie the film together despite an occasional surfeit of quirk." On Metacritic, the film holds a score of 53 out of 100, based on 11 reviews, indicating "mixed or average reviews".

Awards
At the 39th César Awards, the film won the award for Best Cinematography.

Home media
The Young and Prodigious T.S. Spivet was released on DVD and Blu-ray on 4 June 2014 in France, and on 3 November 2015 in the United States. It was also released on Blu-ray in Hong Kong in 2015. Only the French and Hong Kong Blu-ray releases contain the 3D viewing option.

References

External links
 
 

2013 films
2010s English-language films
2010s adventure drama films
French adventure drama films
Canadian adventure drama films
Cross Creek Pictures films
Films directed by Jean-Pierre Jeunet
Films based on American novels
Films shot in Alberta
IMAX films
English-language French films
English-language Canadian films
2013 drama films
2010s Canadian films
2010s French films
Foreign films set in the United States